Maricourt is a municipality in Le Val-Saint-François Regional County Municipality in the Estrie region of Quebec.  The population was 416 in the Canada 2016 Census.

Demographics

Population

Language
Mother tongue (2016)

See also
List of municipalities in Quebec

References

Municipalities in Quebec
Incorporated places in Estrie